Vishnu-Devaa is a 1991 Indian Bollywood romance action film directed by K. Pappu and produced by Shakeel Noorani. It stars Sunny Deol, Aditya Pancholi, Neelam, Sangeeta Bijlani in lead roles.

Plot 
Vishnu and Devaa two brothers became separated due to an incident. Vishnu becomes a Gangster, whereas Devaa is a cop.

Cast
 Sunny Deol as Vishnu Prasad 
 Aditya Pancholi as Inspector Deva Prasad
 Neelam Kothari as Paro
 Sangeeta Bijlani as Sangeeta
 Kulbhushan Kharbanda as Judge Abdul Rehman Khan
 Aruna Irani as Mrs. Ram Prasad
 Aloknath as Baba 
 Danny Denzongpa as Thakur Shamsher Singh / Sampat
 Sharat Saxena as Goga
 Johnny Lever as Constable
 Annu Kapoor as Constable
 Sardar Sohi as Munim

Soundtrack
Lyrics: Anjaan

References

External links

1990s Hindi-language films
1990s action drama films
Films directed by K. Pappu
Films scored by Rajesh Roshan
Indian action drama films